Ivan Ihorovych Brikner (born 30 June 1993) is a Ukrainian professional footballer who plays as a midfielder for FC Okzhetpes.

Career
Brikner is a product of Skala Morshyn and Pokrova Lviv youth sportive school systems.

He played in the teams of a regional level, but in July 2013 signed his contract with the professional Sumy in the Ukrainian First League.

References

External links

1993 births
Living people
Ukrainian footballers
Association football midfielders
FC Avanhard Zhydachiv players
PFC Sumy players
FC Prykarpattia Ivano-Frankivsk (1998) players
FC Olimpik Donetsk players
FC Rukh Lviv players
FC Lviv players
FC Alians Lypova Dolyna players
FC Zhetysu players
FC Okzhetpes players
Ukrainian Premier League players
Ukrainian First League players
Kazakhstan First Division players
Ukrainian expatriate footballers
Expatriate footballers in Kazakhstan
Ukrainian expatriate sportspeople in Kazakhstan
Sportspeople from Lviv Oblast